Hebrew Orphan Asylum may refer to:

Hebrew Orphan Asylum (Baltimore, Maryland)
Hebrew Orphan Asylum of New York